John Price Durbin (October 10, 1800 - October 18, 1876) was an American Methodist clergyman and educator who served as Chaplain of the United States Senate from 1831 to 1832 and president of Dickinson College from 1833 to 1844.

Early life
Durbin was born on October 10, 1800, in Paris, Kentucky, to Elizabeth "Betsy" Nunn and Hozier Durbin; he was the oldest of their five sons. While  he was still young, his father died and he went to work for a cabinetmaker. He continued in this trade until his religious conversion at age 18. Durbin studied Latin, Greek and English grammar with tutors.

Career
Licensed to preach by the Methodist church, Durbin went to Ohio in 1819 in order to begin his ministry. His first church was in Hamilton, Ohio (1821); he entered classes at Miami University while serving there. After another relocation, Durbin continued his college education at Cincinnati College, from which he earned a bachelor's degree and a Master of Arts degree (1825). He was appointed professor of languages at Augusta College in Kentucky.

In 1829, while teaching at Augusta College, his colleagues nominated him as Chaplain of the Senate. His nomination ended in a tie in the Senate, and Vice-President John C. Calhoun voted for another chaplain who was from the church his mother attended. Durbin was reconsidered as Chaplain of the Senate in 1831 and this time won the vote. He had not solicited the position and had been offered a position as professor of natural science at Wesleyan University in Middletown, Connecticut, but declined it so as to accept the position of Chaplain of the Senate. Thereafter, he was editor of the Christian Advocate (1832). In 1833, Dickinson College became part of the Baltimore Conference of the Methodist Church; Durbin was called to be the new president, serving until 1844.

Following retirement from the college, Durbin served Union Methodist Church in Philadelphia.  In 1850 he became secretary of the Missionary Society, serving until 1872, when ill health led to his retirement. His several tours of Europe and the Middle East led to well-received books which he authored.

Durbin died in New York City on October 18, 1876. He was interred in Laurel Hill Cemetery, Philadelphia.

Personal life
Durbin married Frances Budd Cook of Philadelphia on September 6, 1827, in Pennsylvania.  His children with Frances Cook were Lucretia, Augusta, Margaret, Alexander Cook, John Price and William. Following Frances' death he married her sister Margaret Cook in 1839.

Bibliography
Observations in Europe, Principally in France and Great Britain, Harper & Brothers, New York, 1844
Observations in the East: Chiefly in Egypt, Palestine, Syria, and Asia Minor, Harper & Brothers, New York, 1845

Citations

Sources

External links
Dickinson College Archives & Special Collections

 

1800 births
1876 deaths
19th-century American clergy
19th-century American male writers
19th-century American newspaper editors
American cabinetmakers
American Methodist clergy
Burials at Laurel Hill Cemetery (Philadelphia)
Chaplains of the United States Senate
Educators from Kentucky
Miami University alumni
People from Paris, Kentucky
Presidents of Dickinson College
University of Cincinnati alumni
Wesleyan University faculty